Terdiek is a hamlet in the Dutch province of North Holland. It is a part of the municipality of Hollands Kroon, and lies about 7 km northeast of Heerhugowaard.

Terdiek is not a statistical entity, and the postal authorities have placed it under Nieuwe Niedorp. Since 2017, it has place name signs. Terdiek was home to 42 people in 1840. Nowadays, it consists of about 40 houses.

References

Populated places in North Holland
Hollands Kroon